Liputan 6 (The 6 Report) is an Indonesian flagship television news program broadcasts on SCTV. Its slogan is Aktual, Tajam, dan Terpercaya (Current, Sharp, and Trusted).

The first program, Liputan 6 Petang was launched on 20 May 1996, by the first news anchored, Riza Primadi. To greet all viewers, every articles reading always begins with "Saudara" (brother/sister), not "Pemirsa" (viewer) till present. (like Kompas).

In May 20, 2021, Coinciding with their 25th anniversary of Liputan 6 SCTV, the new graphics and opening are launched.

Programs
The show has been broadcast at varying times during the day, although "6" appeared in the title of all shows.
Liputan 6 Pagi – First aired 24 August 1996. Currently aired from 04:30–06:00 WIB.
Liputan 6 Siang – First aired 10 March 1997. Currently aired from 12:00–13:00 WIB.
Liputan 6 Petang – Aired 20 May 1996 until 29 October 2017.
Liputan 6 Malam – First aired 4 February 2003. Currently aired from 01:30–02:00 WIB.
Liputan 6 Terkini – Hourly news capsule. Currently aired weekdays at timeslots outside of Liputan 6 newscasts, for three minutes each. Since 30 October 2017, Liputan 6 Petang was no longer broadcast regularly due to increase of soap opera programming, although they still have some short news during afternoon time under the name "Liputan 6 Petang Terkini".
Liputan 6 Investigasi – First aired April 2, 2017. Currently aired from 01:00-01:30 WIB.

Chronology

Also Called
'Liputan 6 Sore' (7 November 1994 – 19 May 1996)
'RCTI News' (15 November 1990 – 30 April 1996)
Nuansa Pagi (24 August 1993 – 2 July 1995)
Buletin Siang (24 August 1993 – 30 April 1996)
Seputar Indonesia (15 November 1990 – 31 October 1995)
Buletin Malam (1 February 1991 – 11 November 1995)

Time slot history

Liputan 6 Pagi

 06.00 WIB – 07.30 WIB (24 August 1996 – 31 July 1998)
 05.30 WIB - 07.00 WIB (1 August 1998 - 24 August 2005)
 05.30 WIB – 07.30 WIB (25 August 2005 – 24 August 2006)
 05.30 WIB – 06.30 WIB (25 August 2006 – 31 July 2010)
 04.30 WIB - 05.30 WIB (1 August 2010  - 3 October 2012)
 04.30 WIB - 06.00 WIB (3 October 2012 – 31 December 2016, 15–26 May 2017, 24 August 2020 - present)
 04.30 WIB - 06.30 WIB (1 January - 14 May 2017)
 05.15 WIB - 06.00 WIB (27 May 2017 – 23 April 2020)
 05.00 WIB - 07.00 WIB (24 April 2020 – 23 August 2020)

Liputan 6 Terkini
 10.00 WIB – 10.05 WIB (1 July 1997 – 31 December 1999)
 09.55 WIB – 10.00 WIB (1 January 2000 – 31 December 2001)
 10.00 WIB – 10.05 WIB (1 January 2002 – present)
 15.00 WIB – 15.05 WIB (1 July 1997 – 31 December 1999)
 14.55 WIB – 15.00 WIB (1 January 2000 – 31 December 2001).
 15.00 WIB – 15.05 WIB (1 January 2002 – present).
 20.00 WIB – 20.05 WIB (1 July 1997 – 31 December 1999)
 19.55 WIB – 20.00 WIB (1 January 2000 – 31 December 2001)
 20.00 WIB – 20.05 WIB (1 January 2002 – present)
 22.00 WIB – 22.05 WIB (1 July 1997 – 31 December 1999)
 21.55 WIB – 22.00 WIB (1 January 2000 – 31 December 2001)
 22.00 WIB – 22.05 WIB (1 January 2002 – present)

Liputan 6 Siang
 11.30 WIB – 12.00 WIB (10 March 1997 – 3 February 1998, 13 July 2017 - 31 December 2017, 1 July 2021 – 19 February 2023)
 11.00 WIB - 12.00 WIB (4 - 15 February 1998)
 12.00 WIB – 13.00 WIB (16 February 1998 – 28 April 2002, 24 April 2020 - 23 August 2020, 20 February 2023 - present)
 12.00 WIB - 12.30 WIB (29 April 2002 - 12 July 2017, 1 January 2018 - 30 June 2021)

Liputan 6 Petang
 18.30 WIB – 19.00 WIB (20 May 1996 – 19 May 1997)
 18.00 WIB – 18.30 WIB (20 May 1997 – 31 December 1997, 20 May 2003 – 24 August 2004)
 18.00 WIB - 19.00 WIB (1 January 1998 - 19 May 2003)
 17.30 WIB - 18.00 WIB (25 August 2004 – 31 July 2009
 17.00 WIB - 17.30 WIB (1 August 2009 - 13 February 2012)
 16.00 WIB - 16.30 WIB (14 February 2012- 2 October 2012)
 16.30 WIB - 17.00 WIB (3 October 2012 - 30 April 2017)
 14.30 WIB - 15.00 WIB (1 May 2017 - 26 May 2017)
 15.00 WIB - 15.30 WIB (27 May - 2 July 2017)
 16.00 WIB - 16.30 WIB (3 July - 30 October 2017)

Liputan 6 Malam
 22:30 WIB - 23:00 WIB (1 January 2003 - 22 July 2005)
 23:30 WIB - 00:00 WIB (25 July 2005 - 30 June 2006)
 00:00 WIB - 00:30 WIB (4 July 2006 - 31 March 2007)
 00:30 WIB - 01:00 WIB (2 April 2007 - 20 June 2009)
 01:00 WIB - 01:30 WIB (23 June 2009 - 27 November 2010)
 01:30 WIB - 02:00 WIB (29 November 2010 - 23 August 2012, 2015 - present)
 02:00 WIB - 02:30 WIB (24 August 2012 – present)

Sigi Investigasi
 01:00-01:30 WIB (20 January 2005 – present)

Liputan 6 (as a Local News bulletin)
 18.00 WIB - 18.30 WIB (7 November 1994 - 31 July 1995, except during the Ramadhan season of 1995)
 23.00 WIB - 23.30 WIB (1 August 1995  - 31 October 1995)
 18.30 WIB - 19.00 WIB (1 November 1995 - 31 December 1995)
 21:30 WIB - 22:00 WIB (1 January 1996 - 19 May 1996)

Anchors

Special programs

 Potret (1996-Present)
 Sigi (2003-2017; 2020-Present)
 BuSer (2002-Present)
Debat Minggu ini (2001-2003)
 Topik Minggu ini (2003-2008)
 Derap Hukum (1995-2007)
 Usaha Anda (1995-2013; 2020-Present)
 Visi Warta (1993-1996)
 News Watch (1997-2000)
 Di Balik Berita (1994-2000)
 Wakil Kita (1994-1996)

News portal
Liputan 6 also has an online news portal. The news portal, Liputan6.com, was originally launched on 24 August 2000 to coincide with the channel's 10th anniversary. It is currently operated by KapanLagi Youniverse, a subsidiary of SCTV's parent company Emtek Group.

See also 
 Kompas
 Fokus

References

External links
 Liputan 6 on SCTV website 
 Liputan6.com news portal 

Indonesian television news shows
1996 Indonesian television series debuts
2010s Indonesian television series
1990s Indonesian television series
2000s Indonesian television series
SCTV (TV network) original programming